Dreiliņi may refer to:

 Dreiliņi, a neighbourhood in Riga, Latvia
 Dreiliņi, a village in Stopiņi Municipality, Latvia